Demographics of Yugoslavia may refer to:

 Demographics of Yugoslavia, from 1918 to 1992, including
 Demographics of the Kingdom of Yugoslavia, from 1918 to 1945
 Demographics of the Socialist Federal Republic of Yugoslavia, from 1945 to 1992
 Demographics of the Federal Republic of Yugoslavia (Serbia and Montenegro), from 1992 to 2006

See also
 Yugoslavia (disambiguation)
 Yugoslav (disambiguation)